The 1966 Icelandic Cup was the seventh edition of the National Football Cup.

It took place between 16 July 1966 and 23 October 1966, with the final played at Melavöllur in Reykjavik. The cup was important, as winners qualified for the UEFA Cup Winners' Cup (if a club won both the league and the cup, the defeated finalists would take their place in the Cup Winners' Cup). Teams from the Úrvalsdeild karla (1st division) did not enter until the quarter finals. In prior rounds, teams from the 2. Deild (2nd division), as well as reserve teams, played in one-legged matches. In case of a draw, the match was replayed.

KR Reykjavik won their 6th Cup in 7 seasons, beating the Icelandic champions, Valur Reykjavik, 1 - 0 in the final.

First round

Second round

Third round

Quarter finals 
 Entrance of 6 clubs from 1. Deild

Semi finals

Final 

 KR Reykjavik won their sixth Icelandic Cup and qualified for the 1967–68 European Cup Winners' Cup.

See also 

 1966 Úrvalsdeild
 Icelandic Cup

External links 
  1966 Icelandic Cup results at the site of the Icelandic Football Federation

Icelandic Men's Football Cup
Iceland
1966 in Iceland